Boscovich is a lunar impact crater that has been almost completely eroded away by subsequent impacts. It is located west-northwest of the crater Julius Caesar, and south-southeast of the prominent Manilius. The crater floor has a low albedo, and the dark hue makes it relatively easy to recognize. The surface is crossed by the rille system designated Rimae Boscovich that extends for a diameter of 40 kilometres. The crater is named after Croatian physicist Roger Joseph Boscovich.

Satellite craters

By convention these features are identified on lunar maps by placing the letter on the side of the crater midpoint that is closest to Boscovich.

References

External links

Boscovich at The Moon Wiki
Rimae Boscovich at The Moon Wiki
  - on the rille
  – also features nearby Boscovich Crater

Impact craters on the Moon